Mahorn is a surname. Notable people with the surname include:

Atlee Mahorn (born 1965), three-time Canadian Olympic sprinter
Dwayne Mahorn (born 1981), English Rap and Grime MC sometimes known as Durrty Doogz, from London
Paul Mahorn (born 1973), English former football forward
Rick Mahorn (born 1958), American retired NBA basketball player who, at 6'10", played power forward and center

See also
Mahoran (disambiguation)
Marchhorn
Mały Horn